Andrey Sergeevich Zubarev (born March 3, 1987) is a Russian professional ice hockey player currently an unrestricted free agent. He most recently played for Salavat Yulaev Ufa of the Kontinental Hockey League (KHL). He previously played in 4 games in the National Hockey League (NHL) with the Atlanta Thrashers during the  season.

Playing career
Zubarev was drafted 187th overall in the 2005 NHL Entry Draft by the Atlanta Thrashers. Unsigned from the Thrashers, Zubarev played in the Russian Super League with Ak Bars Kazan and Salavat Yulaev Ufa. He joined Atlant Moscow Oblast for the inaugural season of the KHL. 

On August 24, 2010 he signed a two-year, $625,000 contract with the Atlanta Thrashers. He then returned to the KHL. 

After playing five seasons for powerhouse club, SKA Saint Petersburg, Zubarev left as a free agent to continue his career on a two-year contract with Spartak Moscow on 29 May 2020.

International play

Zubarev has played for Russia in the World Junior Championships and the World Championships. For winning the 2014 IIHF World Championship, Andrei Zubarev was awarded the Order of Honour on May 27, 2014. He was a member of the Olympic Athletes from Russia team at the 2018 Winter Olympics and won the gold medal in ice hockey.

Career statistics

Regular season and playoffs

International

Awards and honors

References

External links

RussianProspects.com Andrei Zubarev's Player Profile

1987 births
Ak Bars Kazan players
Atlanta Thrashers draft picks
Atlanta Thrashers players
Chicago Wolves players
Atlant Moscow Oblast players
Living people
Sportspeople from Ufa
Russian ice hockey defencemen
Salavat Yulaev Ufa players
SKA Saint Petersburg players
HC Spartak Moscow players
Ice hockey players at the 2018 Winter Olympics
Olympic ice hockey players of Russia
Medalists at the 2018 Winter Olympics
Olympic medalists in ice hockey
Olympic gold medalists for Olympic Athletes from Russia